is a Japanese long-distance runner. She is the holder of the Japanese national record for 30 km (1:38:35), and the winner of the 2017 Hokkaido Marathon and the 2019 Marathon Grand Championship. She represented Japan at the 2020 Tokyo Olympics.

Maeda won her first marathon in 2017 (Hokkaido Marathon in 2:28:48). She was second in the 2018 Osaka International Women's Marathon, and in the same year won the Sanyo Women's Half Marathon in 1:09:12. In 2020 Maeda won the Japanese Olympic Marathon trials in 2:25:15, beating second placed Ayuko Suzuki and third placed Rei Ohara.

Marathons
Key:

References

External links 

 
 

1996 births
Living people
People from Amagasaki
Sportspeople from Hyōgo Prefecture
Japanese female long-distance runners
Japanese female marathon runners
World Athletics Championships athletes for Japan
Japan Championships in Athletics winners
Olympic athletes of Japan
Olympic female marathon runners
Athletes (track and field) at the 2020 Summer Olympics
20th-century Japanese women
21st-century Japanese women